is a Japanese politician. He served two terms in the House of Councillors in the Diet (national legislature) from 1998 until 2010 as a member of the Liberal Democratic Party. A native of Hiroshima Prefecture and graduate of the University of Tokyo, he worked at the Ministry of Agriculture, Forestry and Fisheries from 1966 to 1996.

References

External links 
  in Japanese.

Members of the House of Councillors (Japan)
Living people
1943 births
Liberal Democratic Party (Japan) politicians